A race engineer is a motorsport team member who analyses data to achieve the best performance from the vehicle and driver. The race engineer communicates with the team's data analyst, mechanics, and driver, both between and during races. Off the race track, the race engineer analyses historical data to determine the initial set-up for the next race event or test. The race engineer's duties also include hands-on management of the vehicle mechanics, organization of the testing schedule, and assurance of compliance with regulations. The race engineer seeks to make these activities occur as seamlessly as possible for the driver. Race engineers almost always have an academic degree in engineering or a related field.

A good race engineer must have good people skills. To be effective, the race engineer must have a good working relationship with not only the driver but also the rest of the team, both at and away from the track. Many times the race engineer is also "the face" of the team for the media; this is especially true during the race while the driver is inaccessible. This makes the race engineer's media skills a priority.

History
The role of the race engineer on racing teams has grown in importance since the adoption of on-board sensors that collect performance data. The race engineer's job is to evaluate the vehicle's performance gathered from both telemetry and the driver's feedback. The race engineer then seeks to improve performance with regard to the driver's desires by adjusting suspension, engine calibrations, aerodynamics, and other variables which affect the vehicle's performance on the race track.

Travel
Race engineers tend to travel extensively, especially during the racing season of their motorsport teams. At the highest level of professional motorsports, international travel is common. Offseason travel for race engineers is usually for testing, training, and visiting vendors.

See also
 Automotive aerodynamics
 Automotive engineering
 Control theory
 Mechanical engineering

References

External links
The Race Engineer
Unusual Journeys: Racing Around with Formula One
Tips for a Career in Motorsports Engineering

Engineering occupations
Motorsport people